The 1991 Grand Prix International de Paris was held at the Halle Olympique in Albertville. It was the test event for the 1992 Winter Olympics. Medals were awarded in the disciplines of men's singles, ladies' singles, pair skating, and ice dancing.

Results

Men

Ladies

Pairs

Ice dancing

External links
 Skate Canada results

Grand Prix International de Paris, 1991
Internationaux de France
Figure
Figure skating in Paris
International figure skating competitions hosted by France